Collaborative project may refer to:

 Collaboration
 Teamwork
 Crowdsourced projects

See also 
 Collaborative writing
 Collaborative editing